Magnolia yoroconte is a species of tree in the family Magnoliaceae. It is found in Guatemala, Belize and Honduras.

Description
Magnolia yoroconte is a large tree, and can live up to 100 years.

Distribution and habitat
Magnolia yoroconte is known from Guatemala, Belize, and Honduras. It has an estimated extent of occurrence (EOO) of over 68,000 km2. Its range includes Columbia Forest Reserve in Toledo District of southern Belize. There are 11 known subpopulations in Guatemala, each with few trees, and separated from one another by over 100 km.

It inhabits cloud forests and submontane forests, particularly along rivers, from 400 up to 2,120 meters elevation.

Populations recorded in Chiapas have now been assigned to new species, Magnolia faustinomirandae and Magnolia zamudioi. It has also been reported in Veracruz, Mexico, but its presence there is unconfirmed and may be another species.

Conservation
The species is has a declining population, and is threatened by deforestation, habitat loss, and timber over-harvesting. Its area and habitat quality are estimated to have declined by 30% over the last three generations. The species is of conservation concern in Guatemala and Honduras. Its conservation status is assessed as vulnerable.

References

yoroconte
Vulnerable plants
Trees of Honduras
Trees of Guatemala
Trees of Belize
Taxonomy articles created by Polbot